Dorsum Cloos is a wrinkle-ridge at  in Mare Smythii on the Moon. It is 103 km long and was named after German geologist Hans Cloos in 1976.

References

Cloos